The Moorish idol (Zanclus cornutus) is a marine fish species, the sole extant representative of the family Zanclidae (from the Greek ζαγκίος, zagkios, "oblique") in order Acanthuriformes.  A common inhabitant of tropical to subtropical reefs and lagoons, the Moorish idol is notable for its wide distribution throughout the Indo-Pacific.  A number of butterflyfishes (genus Heniochus) closely resemble the Moorish idol. It is closely related to, if not a direct descendant of, the extinct Eozanclus brevirostris, from the Middle Eocene of Monte Bolca.

The Moorish idol got its name from the "Moors" of Africa, who purportedly believed the fish to be a bringer of happiness.  Moorish idols are also a coveted aquarium fish but, despite their abundance and wide array of habitats, they are notoriously finicky and hard to adjust to captivity. Their omnivorous diet can be extremely difficult to replicate in aquaria, as the vegetation which they live on is normally exterminated and they have a habit of eating corals and sponges.

Description

With distinctively compressed and disk-like bodies, Moorish idols stand out in contrasting bands of black, white and yellow, which makes them attractive to aquarium keepers. The fish have relatively small fins, except for the dorsal fin, whose six or seven spines are dramatically elongated to form a trailing, sickle-shaped crest called the philomantis extension. Moorish idols have small terminal mouths at the end of long, tubular snouts; many long bristle-like teeth line the mouth. The Moorish idol differs from butterflyfish in having a prominent black, triangular anal fin.

The eyes are set high on the fish's deeply keeled body; in adults, perceptible bumps are located above each. The anal fin may have two or three spines. The sickle-like dorsal spines shorten with age.

Distribution and habitat 
Generally denizens of shallow waters, Moorish idols prefer flat reefs. Their range includes: East Africa, the Indian Ocean, Persian Gulf, the Ducie Islands, Hawaii, southern Japan and all of Micronesia; they are also found from the southern Gulf of California south to Peru.

Feeding
Sponges, coral polyps, tunicates and other benthic invertebrates constitute the bulk of the Moorish idol's diet.

Behavior
Often seen alone, Moorish idols also form pairs or occasionally small schools, especially as juveniles.  They are diurnal fish, sticking to the bottom of the reef at night, adopting a drab coloration.  Like butterfly fish, they mate for life.  Adult males display aggression toward one another.

Reproduction
Moorish idols are pelagic spawners; that is, they release eggs and sperm in the water column, leaving fertilized eggs to drift away with the currents.  The range of these fish may be explained by the unusually long larval stage. The fish reach a length of  before becoming free-swimming juveniles.

In the aquarium 

Moorish idols are notoriously difficult to maintain in captivity. They require large tanks, often exceeding , are voracious eaters, and can become destructive.

Some aquarists prefer to keep substitute species that look very similar to the Moorish idol. These substitutes are all butterflyfishes of the genus Heniochus and include the pennant coralfish, H. acuminatus; threeband pennantfish, H. chrysostomus and the false Moorish idol, H. diphreutes.

Moorish idols typically are very picky eaters. They will either eat no food and perish, or eat everything all at once.

Timeline

In popular culture
 In the 2003 Disney/Pixar animated movie Finding Nemo, a Moorish idol fish named Gill, voiced by Willem Dafoe, was one of Nemo's tank mates and the leader of the Tank Gang. Gill was depicted having a very strong desire for freedom outside of the aquarium and was constantly scheming to achieve this, possibly alluding to the difficulty of keeping real-life Moorish idols in captivity. Gill and the other members of the Tank Gang appeared in the 2016 sequel, Finding Dory in the post credits scene during the end credits. 
 Moorish idols have long been among the most recognizable of coral reef fauna. Their image has graced all types of products, such as: shower curtains, blankets, towels and wallpaper made with an ocean or underwater theme.
 Moorish idols appear in the 2011 video game Go Vacation as one of forty sea creatures to observe while scuba diving.

References

External links
 

 
Fish of Hawaii
Fish of Palau
Monotypic fish genera
Fish described in 1758
Taxa named by Carl Linnaeus